Mazzoleni is an Italian surname. Notable people with the surname include:

Eddy Mazzoleni (born 1973), Italian bicycle racer
Marc'Antonio Mazzoleni, Italian instrument maker
Ettore Mazzoleni (1905-1968), Canadian conductor
Roberto Mazzoleni, Italian sprinter

Italian-language surnames